The Kenya Evangelical Lutheran Church is a Lutheran denomination in Kenya. It is a member of the Lutheran World Federation, which it joined in 1992. It is also a member of the National Council of Churches of Kenya.

External links 
 
Lutheran World Federation listing
World Council of Churches listing

International Lutheran Council members
Lutheran denominations
Lutheran World Federation members
Lutheranism in Kenya